The stone moroko (Pseudorasbora parva), also known as the topmouth gudgeon, is a fish belonging to the Cyprinid family, native to Asia, but introduced and now considered an invasive species in Europe and North America. The fish's size is rarely above 8 cm and usually 2 to 7.5 cm long.

Invasive species 
In Europe, P. parva is included since 2016 in the list of Invasive Alien Species of Union concern (the Union list). This implies that this species cannot be imported, bred, transported, commercialized, or intentionally released into the environment in the whole of the European Union.

The fish was introduced in the 1960s into ponds in Nucet, Dâmbovița County, Romania and it made its way into Danube, then spreading throughout Europe. They pose danger to other species such as the sunbleaks (Leucaspius delineatus). They are the carrier of a parasite (Sphaerothecum destruens) that is not damaging to the topmouth gudgeon, but attacks other fishes like the sunbleaks, which are unable to spawn and have a higher mortality when infected. They also feed on eggs of locally valuable native fish species.

Four phylogenetic lineages of Pesudorasbora parva were identified within its native range, and three of them contributed to the dispersal within more western regions of Eurasia. One of these lineages was initially distributed in the north of China and the Far East of Russia, the second one was in southern China, the third one was in the Korean Peninsula and, probably, in the adjacent regions of China, the fourth - in the Taiwan. Geographical distribution of COI lineages suggests three donor regions of stone moroko invasions into more western regions of Eurasia: the basin of the Yangtze River, the northern (Russian) part of the Amur River basin, and the Sungari River basin (right tributary of the Amur in the territory of China).

The species has also been recently discovered in several lakes in the UK where it is believed to have been illegally stocked. This has called for a large scale eradication programme organised by the Environment Agency who kill the fish off with a piscicide called rotenone.

References 

Pseudorasbora
Taxa named by Coenraad Jacob Temminck
Taxa named by Hermann Schlegel
Fish described in 1846